Eoauchenia is a genus of extinct proterotheriid from the Late Miocene and Early Pliocene of Argentina. The genus was named by Ameghino in 1887 for the type species E. primitiva, which was originally known from the early Pliocene Monte Hermoso Formation of the Montehermosan age of Buenos Aires Province, but has since been found in the Cerro Azul Formation of the late Huayquerian of La Pampa Province. The fossils originally known included postcranial remains like foot material, but teeth, a skull and skeleton, and mandibles and further postcrania have since been referred to Eoauchenia, which can be distinguished from Epitherium found alongside it by more gracile bones.

References

Proterotheriids
Miocene mammals of South America
Neogene Argentina
Fossils of Argentina
Fossil taxa described in 1887
Taxa named by Florentino Ameghino
Cerro Azul Formation